NGC 4091 is a spiral galaxy located 360 million light-years away in the constellation Coma Berenices. The galaxy was discovered by astronomer Heinrich d'Arrest on May 2, 1864. NGC 4091 is a member of the NGC 4065 Group and is a LINER galaxy.

See also
 List of NGC objects (4001–5000)

References

External links

4091
038308
Coma Berenices
Astronomical objects discovered in 1864
Spiral galaxies
NGC 4065 Group
LINER galaxies
07083
Discoveries by Heinrich Louis d'Arrest